The Hillside mine is a proposed mine located in southern Australia in South Australia. It will be near the current intersection of the Yorke Highway and St Vincent Highway. The mine is proposed to focus initially on copper, but it is licensed to produce copper, gold and iron ore.

Mine approvals and development
The mining lease was granted on 16 September 2014 for a term of 21 years. Mining will not start until after the approval of a Program for Environment Protection and Rehabilitation (PEPR) which was required to be submitted before 16 September 2015. In July 2015, Rex requested and received a 12-month extension, revising the due date for submission of the PEPR and Social Management Plan (SMP) to 16 September 2016. This was extended again in August 2016 to make the new deadline 16 September 2017. The Social Management Plan was submitted to the government in September 2017. A further extension was sought for the PEPR, to 26 February 2018. The 2,500 page PEPR was submitted to the government on 2 February 2018. It proposes a 13-year mine life and Rex stated that it intended to start construction of the mine within 12 months of receiving approval.

References 

Copper mines in South Australia
Gold mines in South Australia
Mining in South Australia
Yorke Peninsula